The genus Onychodactylus, commonly known as clawed salamanders, is composed of three species, all endemic to eastern Asia. O. fischeri is found on the Korean peninsula, as well as in the Russian Far East and adjacent regions of China. O. japonicus is found in Japan, on the islands of Shikoku and Honshū. All species are lungless with moderately developed parotoid glands. They inhabit moist, forested mountains near small rivers, streams, and lakes. Adults of each species can reach a length of 19 cm.

Species
Species recognized as of October 2019:

References

External links
 [web application]. 2010. Berkeley, California: Onychodactylus. AmphibiaWeb, available at http://amphibiaweb.org/. (Accessed: November 20, 2010).